The 1992 Murphys Irish Professional Championship was a professional invitational snooker tournament, which took place between 18 and 21 May 1992 at Jury's Hotel in Cork, Republic of Ireland.

Joe Swail won the title by beating Jason Prince 9–1 in the final.

Main draw

References

Irish Professional Championship
Irish Professional Championship
Irish Professional Championship
Irish Professional Championship